Willkani (willka or wilka Anadenanthera colubrina (a tree), Aymara willka sun,-ni a suffix, hispanicized spelling Huilcane, Huilcani) is a mountain in the Andes of southern Peru, about  high. It is located in the Moquegua Region, Mariscal Nieto Province, Carumas District, southwest of Chaka Apachita.

References

Mountains of Moquegua Region
Mountains of Peru